is a former Japanese football player. He played for Japan national team.

Club career
Takakuwa was born in Tokyo on August 10, 1973. After graduating from high school, he joined Yokohama Marinos (later Yokohama F. Marinos) in 1992. However he could not play in the match behind Japan national team goalkeeper, Shigetatsu Matsunaga and Yoshikatsu Kawaguchi. He moved to Kashima Antlers in 1996. In 1998, he became a regular goalkeeper and won the champions in J1 League. In Asia, the club won 1998–99 Asian Cup Winners' Cup. In 2000, the club won all three major title in Japan; J1 League, J.League Cup and Emperor's Cup. He also was selected Best Eleven. In 2001, his opportunity to play decreased behind Hitoshi Sogahata. He moved to Tokyo Verdy in 2002 and Vegalta Sendai in 2003. At Vegalta Sendai, he played as regular goalkeeper from 2004 to July 2006. In 2007, he returned to Yokohama F. Marinos for the first time in 11 years. However he could hardly play in the match. He moved to Tokushima Vortis in 2009 and retired end of 2009 season.

National team career
In October 2000, Takakuwa was selected Japan national team for 2000 Asian Cup. At this competition, on October 20, he debuted against Qatar. Although he played only one match, Japan won the champions.

Club statistics

National team statistics

National team
 2000 Asian Cup (champions)

Honors and awards

Individual Honors
 J1 League Best Eleven: 2000

Team Honors
 AFC Asian Cup Champions: 2000

References

External links
 
 
 
 Japan National Football Team Database
 

1973 births
Living people
Association football people from Tokyo
Japanese footballers
Japan international footballers
J1 League players
J2 League players
Yokohama F. Marinos players
Kashima Antlers players
Tokyo Verdy players
Vegalta Sendai players
Tokushima Vortis players
2000 AFC Asian Cup players
AFC Asian Cup-winning players
Association football goalkeepers